Tommy Hightower is a retired American football coach.  He served as the head football coach at Western New Mexico University from 1966 to 1968 where he achieved a record of 10–15.

Hightower played college football for the Eastern New Mexico University where he was a star fullback and defensive back.

References

External links
 Eastern New Mexico Hall of Honor profile

Year of birth missing (living people)
Living people
American football defensive backs
American football fullbacks
Eastern New Mexico Greyhounds football players
Western New Mexico Mustangs football coaches